Anthony Andrew Barone Sr. (July 20, 1946June 25, 2019) was an American basketball coach and scout. A native of Chicago, he was head coach of the Memphis Grizzlies of the National Basketball Association (NBA). Barone was appointed as the team's interim coach by Grizzlies general manager Jerry West after West fired Mike Fratello on December 28, 2006. Prior to landing his first head coaching job after Fratello's dismissal, Barone had served as an assistant coach for five seasons. Barone was also the Grizzlies' director of player personnel.

Barone was an Academic All-American while playing at Duke, where he graduated with a degree in English in 1971. He was previously the head coach at Creighton from 1985 to 1991. During his time at Creighton, Barone compiled a 102–82 record and led Creighton to two NCAA Division I men's basketball tournament appearances. Barone was pursued by major Division I programs and took the head coach position at Texas A&M, where he led the team from 1991 to 1998. During his Texas A&M tenure, Barone compiled a record of 76–120 while having only one winning season. Barone was fired as head coach at Texas A&M following the 1997–98 season. He was a member of the Chicagoland Sports Hall of Fame.

Barone died on June 25, 2019 at the age of 72.

Head coaching record

|-
| style="text-align:left;"|Memphis
| style="text-align:left;"|
|52||16||36|||| style="text-align:center;"|5th in Southwest||—||—||—||—
| style="text-align:center;"|Missed playoffs
|- class="sortbottom"
| style="text-align:left;"|Career
| ||52||16||36|||| ||—||—||—||—

References

External links
 NBA.com coach profile
 Duke Blue Devils player statistics

1946 births
2019 deaths
American men's basketball coaches
American men's basketball players
Basketball coaches from Illinois
Basketball players from Chicago
College men's basketball head coaches in the United States
Creighton Bluejays men's basketball coaches
Duke Blue Devils men's basketball players
Memphis Grizzlies assistant coaches
Memphis Grizzlies head coaches
Sportspeople from Chicago
Texas A&M Aggies men's basketball coaches